This is a list of notable Persian-style violinists.

Persian violinists
Abolhasan Saba (1902–1957)
Parviz Yahaghi (1936–2007)
Ruhollah Khaleghi (1906–1965)
Ali-Naqi Vaziri (1887–1979)
Ali Tajvidi (1919–2006)
Hossein Yahaghi (1903–1968)
Asadollah Malek (1941–2002)
Habibollah Badiei (1933–1992)
Rahmatollah Badiyi (born 1936)
Homayoun Khorram (1930–2013)
Shahrdad Rohani (born 1954)
Khachik Babayan (born 1956)
Farid Farjad (born 1938)
Mojtaba Mirzadeh (1945–2005)
Arsalan Kamkar (born 1960)
Mahmoud Zolfonoun (1920–2013)
Reza Mahjubi (1898–1954)
Bijan Mortazavi (born 1957)

Persian